Carl Theodor Georg Philipp Welcker (* 29 March 1790, in Oberofleiden – 10 March 1869, in Neuenheim bei Heidelberg) was a German legal scholar, law professor, politician, and journalist.

Biography

Education and early career
He studied at the universities of Giessen and Heidelberg and qualified as a lecturer in 1813 at Giessen. A work on the philosophy of law that he published that year brought about his appointment as extraordinary professor. But after a short time, in 1814, he left his alma mater to follow a call from Kiel, where along with his academic duties he edited the Kieler Blätter, which appeared for the first time in the middle of 1815.  Called in 1817 to Heidelberg, he stayed there only until 1819, when he followed a call to Bonn. Here his work was hindered because of an 1817 petition to the diet he had signed which had asked for a provincial constitution.  This provoked an inquiry against him which was ultimately fruitless: he defended himself against collusion in demagogic activity with a complete disclosure.

University of Freiburg
After the case was complete he gladly followed a call from the Grand Duchy of Baden to the University of Freiburg, where he lectured on pandects and constitutional law. Welcker attracted a following among the students, who he introduced to the depths of his knowledge and sought to develop their enthusiasm for the problems it presented, while his colleagues contented themselves with exercising only the students' memories. The all-encompassing character of his lectures is best understood by consulting the encyclopedic work he undertook in the 1820s called The inner and outer system of practical, natural and Roman-Christian-Germanic precepts of law, statecraft and lawmaking, of which a first volume appeared, though no more followed.

Politician and journalist
With the political turnabout following the assumption of power of Grand Duke Leopold in Baden, Welcker entered the political field in 1830 with a campaign for freedom of the press. This was followed by his entry in 1831 into the second chamber of the Baden diet, to which he had been elected by the precinct of Ettenheim in the Breisgau as their representative. He remained in the diet for nearly 20 years. In the Baden diet, Welcker displayed tireless and frequently successful effort on behalf of the development of political machinery conducive to freedom. Again and again, for almost eighteen years, he fought against censorship, with even greater energy when the freedom of the press won in 1832 after a short time had to yield to the decrees of the Bundestag of the German Confederation led by Prussia and Austria. That the second chamber held to its right, over strong objections from the government, to develop an integrated German Confederation of national unity and civil freedom, this was essentially Welcker's doing, since he never contented himself with just improving the legislation and administration of the grand duchy with his numerous proposals, but always kept his eye on the grand scheme and early on introduced in the chamber the principles for the reform of the Bundestag and brought them to debate.

In the short time that freedom of the press reigned in Baden, Welcker used it to establish a liberal newsletter, Der Freisinnige ("The Independent"), where he published a series of articles advocating emphatically for sincere and continuing constitutional reform and for freedom-enhancing lawmaking, while on the other hand energetically speaking against the tendency which was gradually taking root in southern Germany to seek by revolutionary means what the governments denied. When Der Freisinnige was suppressed by the Confederation decree of 19 July 1832, and when Welcker spoke out forcefully against what he saw as an illegal proceeding he was suspended from his teaching position.  At the same time the University of Freiburg, where along with Karl von Rotteck and other like-minded colleagues, he had taken a hostile attitude toward the tendencies the government was led by, was closed indefinitely. In October, Welcker retired and because of articles he had published in the Freisinnige, a complaint was issued against him, and he was sentenced by the Freiburg court to jail for slandering the government, a sentence which was set aside by a higher court in response to an appeal.

Welcker then moved his fight against the government to the diet, where he strove against the ministers in those areas he saw the liberal reforms obtained by threatening the constitution. He was reproached on one hand for indiscriminate opposition, and on the other hand for a barren cult of phraseology. Contrary to the first claim, in spite of his oppositional stance, he had cooperated zealously and unreservedly in those areas where he found himself in agreement with the government. And if he could be rightfully reproached for a lofty manner of speaking which was more often directed to listeners in the gallery and the public at large than to his colleagues, bound with this public mannerism was without doubt a sincere striving to reach a goal which seemed accessible only with the assistance of the pressure of public opinion on the government.

Occasionally he slipped into personal attacks against ministers, but the government's proceedings against him were also often sharp and ruthless. He was opposed with the sharpest of tones not only in the chamber but (with the help of the censors) his speeches were also recorded in the newspapers in mutilated form while they left out his justifications. He was personally slandered many times.  The influence of the government made his reelection in 1837 in the Ettenheim precinct impossible, his professorship at the University of Freiburg which he had reoccupied in 1840 was taken away from him for a second time in 1841 because of his attitude in the diet.  But in the new elections after the chamber was dissolved in 1841, his old Ettenheim precinct gave him the satisfaction of choosing him again as their representative.

If most of the proposals he had made in the second chamber in the years 1835-1841 were of such a character that, as he himself would have had to concede, if they had succeeded in being accepted, the government would not have allowed them to become law. But with Friedrich von Blittersdorf's departure from the ministry, the conflict between the diet and the government had lost its primacy and sharpness, and the second chamber concerned itself with the solution of very practical problems, and Welcker played a valuable role, especially as the reporter on the deliberations on the list of punishments and imprisonment laws, and in the discussion of the laws on criminal procedure. His political-polemical publications took the greatest notice of the 1843 publication of the minutes of the Carlsbad Conference of 1819 and the closing minutes of the Vienna ministerial conference of 1834 in the papers of the constitutional scholar Johann Ludwig Klüber.

Revolutions of 1848
His years-long, detailed occupation with all the questions pertaining to the organization and laws of the German Confederation made it apparent that with the insinuation of the French February Revolution into the public's consciousness in Germany that a new formation of the relationships between Germany's peoples would become a burning issue. In Baden's second chamber as well as in the independent associations that had come together by March 1848, discussion began of the future form of Germany, and Welcker was entrusted with relevant and important development, especially at the Heidelberg assembly of 5 March, in the Siebenerausschuß, which prepared for a gathering of representatives in Frankfurt, and for the Vorparlament (a preparatory meeting for the Frankfurt Parliament). Welcker, in his constitutional proposals at these proceedings, opposed radicalism sharply as well as unification enthusiasms and spoke out for the right of the members of the existing governments to participate in the new formation of Germany.

On 14 March 1848, the Baden government had named Welcker as its Bundestag representative, having informed Baron von Blittersdorff that it could no longer retain him in that position against the public opinion of the land. In this capacity, as well as for the Frankfurt Parliament (also called the National Assembly), as a member of which the 14th Baden precinct had elected him, he now had the duty of concerning himself with German constitutional questions. In addition, Welcker was entrusted by the Reich's caretaker with many diplomatic missions, to Vienna and Olmütz among other places, where he was to discuss with the Austrian government certain conceding concessions to the revolutionaries, and to Sweden, where he brought along the young Victor von Scheffel as a secretary.

During the discussion of the leadership question in the National Assembly, Welcker parted company with the large Centrumspartei which he had previously belonged to, since, after his diplomatic journeys, he could not get friendly with the idea of having Prussia at the head of Germany. As far as leadership was concerned, he recommended that Austria and Prussia rule in alternation. Since this proposal only received 80 votes, in the name of a minority in February 1849 he made a counter proposal for a constitution for the empire which would have a directorate of seven members under the alternating presidency of the two major powers. The calls for an "indivisible, permanent constitutional hereditary monarchy" in Austria, left Welcker, who had always considered only an absorption of the German lands of Austria into the new union, bitterly disappointed. He now made a major about-face, and, without informing his own party (Vereinigung des Pariser Hofes), on March 12 in the National Assembly he made the surprising proposal to "accept the entire imperial constitution as it now stands after the first reading before the constitution committee with regard to the wishes for a government, and accept it with a single vote," and have a deputation take it to the king of Prussia to show him his naming as the hereditary Kaiser. When this proposal was rejected, Welcker voted in the detailed discussion of the imperial constitution with his old friends, the Centrumspartei.

The rejection of the Kaiser crown by Frederick William IV of Prussia was a new disappointment for him, and, after that blow, when he voted during the thirtieth gathering on the imperial constitution, he had only the achievement of a constitution at any price in mind, and always voted with the radicals. When on 26 May 1849 his proposal was turned down to make a proclamation to the people rejecting the mixing of foreigners in German affairs, he left the National Assembly. His decision to also step down from his governmental office protected him from the fate of various political friends after the suppression of the Baden Revolution who were dismissed although they had nothing to do with the revolution and moreover had fought it strongly.

Later activities
Aside from his representation of Bretten precinct in the Baden second chamber in 1850, Welcker no longer took official part in public life.  In 1841 he had moved his residence to Heidelberg, where, in quiet retirement with his family, he worked on his reminiscences and literature. Many of his works came out in new editions, a special example being a third edition of the constitutional dictionary (12 vols., Altona, 1834–44; 3d ed., 14 vols., Leipzig, 1856–66) in the years 1857–66, which he had started writing with his friend Rotteck in 1834, and after Rotteck's death in 1840 he had finished it on his own in 1843. The significance of this work, which glorified constitutional monarchy, lay essentially in its point of view and its presentation suited to the understanding of the middle class.

When in the beginning of the 1860s liberalism as well as the national ideal received renewed interest, Welcker was soon on the political scene again. At the conference of representatives in Weimar in September 1862, and at the gathering in Frankfurt, which took place at the same time as the gathering of princes, and in 1866 at the gathering of representatives in the same city, he was the zealous and warm proponent of unification. But he lacked a clear understanding of these times, which so completely differed from the times of his earlier work. This explains why after 1866 he continued to work against German unity under Prussia's leadership and adhered to the agitation of the Swabian particularists.

When Welcker developed a lung inflammation on 2 March 1869, most of the younger generation had forgotten his name. But in the development of German liberalism in the fight against the reaction of the Bundestag led by Austria and Prussia, Welcker had taken a prominent role, so that in the history of political life in Germany his name next to that of Rotteck and other early fighters, especially those of the 1830s, is assured of a persistent recollection.

Notes

Further reading
 Anton Jansson, "Building or destroying community: the concept of Sittlichkeit in the political thought of Vormärz Germany." Global Intellectual History 5.1 (2020): 86–103. online. Argues Welcker connected the idea to constitutional liberties.
 

1790 births
1869 deaths
German journalists
German male journalists
Jurists from Hesse
Members of the Frankfurt Parliament
Members of the Second Chamber of the Diet of the Grand Duchy of Baden
University of Giessen alumni
Heidelberg University alumni
Academic staff of the University of Freiburg
German male writers